Philippe Cataldo (born August 24, 1954 in Bône in French Algeria) is a French singer and composer. He is best known for his 1986 hit single "Les Divas du dancing", which deals with the suave swingers of tropical nights and which reached number 8 in the French charts that year. Cataldo himself composed the music for the song, but the lyrics were by musician and translator Jean Schultheis.

Cataldo returned to the stage briefly for a concert tour called RFM Party 80, which celebrated the hits and artists of the eighties.

Singles
1983: "J'aurai l'air de quoi"
1984: "Laisse-là"
1986: "Les Divas du dancing" – No. 8 in France, Silver disc
1989: "Ne t'en fais pas"

References

External links
Philippe Cataldo on Last.fm
Philippe Cataldo sur FanMusik.com

1954 births
Living people
People from Annaba
French male singers
French pop singers